The Evacuees is a 1975 play written by Jack Rosenthal and directed by Alan Parker for the BBC. It was broadcast by BBC2 on 5 March 1975  with a repeat on BBC2 25 December 1975  and again on BBC1 on 13 April 1976.

It was broadcast again on BBC Four, on 16 September 2020; the continuity announcer stated it was a "freshly restored print."

Starring Rosenthal's wife, Maureen Lipman, The Evacuees won a BAFTA for Best Play  and an International Emmy.

The film was released on DVD as part of a collection of Rosenthal's work for the BBC, by Acorn Media on 4 April 2011.

Plot
The filmed play is set during the Blitz. Loosely based on Rosenthal's personal experiences, it centres on the lives of two Jewish boys, Neville and Danny, who are evacuated from Manchester to Blackpool.

Cast
 Maureen Lipman as Sarah Miller
 Gary Carp as Danny Miller
 Steven Serember as Neville Miller
 Margery Mason as Mrs Graham
 Ray Mort as Louis Miller
 Paul Besterman as Zuckerman
 Christine Buckley as office woman
 Ted Carroll as fireman
 Barron Casenov as Mr Grossfine
 Margery Withers as Grandma Miller
 Aubrey Edwards as Wilhelm
 Ian East as Mr Goldstone
 Ivor Roberts as Mr Graham
 Laurence Cohen as Merton
 Louis Raynes as Bernard
 Malcolm Hebden as Man in Synagogue

References

External links 
 

1975 television films
1975 films
1975 television plays
British television films
Films directed by Alan Parker
British World War II films
Battle of Britain films
Films about Jews and Judaism
Films set in Blackpool
BBC Film films
BBC Television
1970s British films